Marion may refer to some places in the U.S. state of Wisconsin:

Marion, Wisconsin, a city located partially in Shawano and Waupaca Counties
Marion, Grant County, Wisconsin, a town
Marion, Juneau County, Wisconsin, a town
Marion, Waushara County, Wisconsin, a town